Pylesville is an unincorporated community and census-designated place (CDP) in Harford County, Maryland, United States. The population was 693 at the 2010 census. It is part of the Baltimore metropolitan area. Legend says the town was named after Brandon Pyles. Until 1958, this community was served by the Maryland and Pennsylvania Railroad at milepost 40.3.

Geography
Pylesville is in northern Harford County and straddles Broad Creek, an east-flowing tributary of the Susquehanna River. Maryland Route 165 runs through the town, leading northeast  to the Pennsylvania border near Cardiff and southwest  to Jarrettsville. Maryland Route 543 leaves MD 165 just south of the town center, leading south  to Hickory.

The CDP extends west from the original settlement of Pylesville as far as Maryland Route 24 (St. Clair Bridge Road).

Demographics

Education
The Harford County Public School System serves Pylesville. Students in the area attend the Tri-school community of North Harford Elementary, High, and Middle schools, all located in the western part of the CDP, along with students form Jarrettsville, Forest Hill, Bel Air, Darlington, Whiteford, Street/Pylesville, Highland, and Norrisville.

Notable people
 Thomas Wagoner, politician in Alaska

References

Census-designated places in Harford County, Maryland
Census-designated places in Maryland